Danail Tsonev Nikolaev (30 December 1852 – 29 August 1942) was a Bulgarian officer and Minister of War on the eve of the Balkan wars. He was the first person to attain the highest rank in the Bulgarian military, General of the infantry. He was also known as "the patriarch of the Bulgarian military".

Biography 
Danail Nikolaev was born in Bolgrad, Russian Empire (now Ukraine) to a Bulgarian family, who were refugees from Tarnovo. In 1871 he graduated from the Bolgrad Gymnasium and joined the Volunteer company of 54th Minsk regiment. On 19 September 1873 he joined the Infantry school in Odessa as a cadet, graduating in 1875. Nikolaev returned to his regiment in Chişinău as an acting cadet on 20 July. Realizing that Serbia was preparing for war with the Ottoman empire, he requested resignation from military service to join the war on 14 June 1876. His request was reviewed by division commander General Dragomirov, who furloughed him instead. As a volunteer he took part in Serbo-Turkish War in the battles of Babina glava, Mirovitsa and Gamzi grad. He was awarded Order of Prince Danilo I and other decorations.

References

Sources
 
 Пеев, П., Генералъ отъ пехотата Данаилъ Николаевъ, София, 1942, трето издание
 Недев, С., Командването на българската войска през войните за национално обединение, София, 1993, Военноиздателски комплекс "Св. Георги Победоносец“, стр. 21–22
 Димитров, И., Съединението 1885 – енциклопедичен справочник, София, 1985, Държавно издателство "д-р Петър Берон“
 Ташев, Ташо (1999). "Министрите на България 1879–1999“. София: АИ "Проф. Марин Дринов“ / Изд. на МО.  / .

Bulgarian generals
Bessarabian Bulgarians
People from Bolhrad
Bulgarian people of the Russo-Turkish War (1877–1878)
People of the Serbo-Bulgarian War
Bulgarian military personnel of the Balkan Wars
1852 births
1942 deaths
Recipients of the Order of Bravery
Recipients of the Order of St. Anna, 3rd class
Recipients of the Medal for Bravery (Serbia)
Recipients of the Order of the Star of Romania
Recipients of the Order of the Medjidie, 1st class
Defence ministers of Bulgaria